Everett Little Booe (September 28, 1891 – March 21, 1969) was a professional baseball player. He played in two seasons in Major League Baseball, primarily as an outfielder. He played part of 1913 for the Pittsburgh Pirates, then jumped to the Federal League in 1914. He played for two teams that season, the Indianapolis Hoosiers and the Buffalo Buffeds.

Booe also had an extensive minor league career, playing from  until 1930. From 1926 to the end of his playing career, he served as manager for six different minor league teams. In 1927, he managed the Danville Veterans to the championship of the Three-I League while batting .260 in 87 games.

Head coaching record

Football

References

External links

1891 births
1969 deaths
Baseball players from North Carolina
Basketball coaches from North Carolina
Buffalo Buffeds players
College men's track and field athletes in the United States

Danville Veterans players
Davidson Wildcats baseball players
Davidson Wildcats football coaches
Davidson Wildcats football players
Dayton Aviators players
Fort Smith Twins players
Fort Wayne Chiefs players
Greensboro Patriots players
Indianapolis Hoosiers players
Major League Baseball outfielders
Minor league baseball managers
People from Mocksville, North Carolina
Petersburg Goobers players
Pittsburgh Pirates players
Players of American football from North Carolina
Portsmouth Truckers players
Presbyterian Blue Hose football coaches
Presbyterian Blue Hose men's basketball coaches
San Antonio Bears players
San Antonio Bronchos players
Springfield Ponies players
Springfield Watchmakers players
St. Joseph Saints players
St. Paul Saints (AA) players